Major-General Iona Timofeevich Nikitchenko (Russian: Иона  Тимофеевич Никитченко) (June 28, 1895 – April 22, 1967) was a judge of the Supreme Court of the Soviet Union.

Early life and career
Iona was born to a peasant family in khutor Tuzlukov (now Rostov Oblast). He studied at his local Agricultural Institute and from 1916 was a Bolshevik. His court experience started in May 1920 when he was appointed as the chairman-deputy of the Military Court of Semirechye Army Group during the Civil War. During the Russian Civil War, he participated on the frontlines in Central Asia. In 1924, he was appointed as the member of the Military Court Collegiate of the Moscow Military District.

Nikitchenko presided over some of the most notorious of Joseph Stalin's show trials during the Great Purges from 1936 to 1938 and notably sentenced Lev Kamenev and Grigory Zinoviev.

Nuremberg trials
Nikitchenko was one of the three main drafters of the London Charter. He was also the Soviet Union's judge at the Nuremberg trials and was president for the session at Berlin. Nikitchenko's prejudices were evident from the outset. Before the Tribunal had convened, Nikitchenko explained the Soviet perspective of the trials:"We are dealing here with the chief war criminals who have already been convicted and whose conviction has been already announced by both the Moscow and Crimea [Yalta] declarations by the heads of the [Allied] governments.... The whole idea is to secure quick and just punishment for the crime."

Nikitchenko dissented against the acquittals of Hjalmar Schacht, Franz von Papen and Hans Fritzsche; he also argued for a death sentence for Rudolf Hess, who was ultimately sentenced to life in prison by the tribunal. Nikitchenko said, in the lead-up to the trials, "If... the judge is supposed to be impartial, it would only lead to unnecessary delays." Nikitchenko also found the majority judgments incorrect with regard to the Reich Cabinet, the German General Staff and the Oberkommando der Wehrmacht. Having never before written a dissenting opinion—these being unheard of in Soviet jurisprudence—and being unsure of the form of such an opinion, Nikitchenko was assisted in writing his dissents by his fellow judge Norman Birkett.

Nikitchenko feared a compromise on too lenient a level. At the point of final deliberation he reexamined Hess' case and voted for a life sentence so that the opportunity for Hess to get away with a lesser degree of punishment did not occur.

References

1895 births
1967 deaths
Soviet people of World War II
Soviet jurists
20th-century jurists
Judges of the International Military Tribunal in Nuremberg
Soviet judges of international courts and tribunals
Soviet major generals